Daniel McIvor (14 February 1871 – 2 September 1965) was a Liberal party member of the House of Commons of Canada. He was born in Lurgy, County Tyrone, Ireland.  He was the father of Canadian aviator Dan McIvor.

McIvor graduated from Manitoba College in 1905 and became a Presbyterian then United Church of Canada minister. McIvor married Gertrude Margaret Bissett (30 December 1908). After preaching in various congregations in Manitoba, he was appointed to Fort William, Ontario in 1926.

He was first elected at the Fort William riding in the 1935 general election. McIvor was re-elected to successive terms in Parliament there in 1940, 1945, 1949, 1953 and 1957. He supported a national old age pension system since introducing a 1937 Parliamentary resolution. After completing his final term, the 23rd Canadian Parliament, McIvor retired from federal politics and did not stand for re-election in 1958.

McIvor died aged 94 at Fort William in 1965, where he remained after leaving his political career. John Diefenbaker, then leader of the opposition Progressive Conservatives, noted that McIvor "was the most beloved member that the House of Commons has known in my time. He was a friend of the sick, of the afflicted and the underdog. He lived to serve others."

References

External links
 

1871 births
1965 deaths
Members of the House of Commons of Canada from Ontario
Liberal Party of Canada MPs
Ministers of the United Church of Canada
University of Manitoba alumni
Politicians from Thunder Bay